Mohanlal Saxena (1896-1965) was an Indian writer and politician from Uttar Pradesh. He served as the Union Minister of
Rehabilitation (1948-1950). He was a member of the United Provinces Legislative Council (1924-1926), Central Legislative Assembly (1935-1947), Constituent Assembly of India, Provisional Parliament (1950-1952) and the Barabanki (Lok Sabha constituency) (1952-1957). He was nominated as a member of Rajya Sabha from 1959 to 1964. Saxena was also the Secretary/ President of UP Congress Committee in 1929-1935 and 1937–1939.

Sources
Brief Biodata

Nominated members of the Rajya Sabha
India MPs 1952–1957
Members of the Constituent Assembly of India
1896 births
1965 deaths
Lok Sabha members from Uttar Pradesh
Indian National Congress politicians from Uttar Pradesh